Qaleh-ye Khoda Morovvat (also Romanized as Qal‘eh-ye Khodā Morovvat; also known as Qal‘a Khamrud Khan, Qal‘eh Khamrud Khan, Qal‘eh Khodā Morovvat Khān, Qal‘eh-ye Khodā Morovat Khān, Qal‘eh-ye Khodā Morovvatkhān, and Qal‘eh-ye Khodā Morovvat Khān) is a village in Zalu Ab Rural District, in the Central District of Ravansar County, Kermanshah Province, Iran. At the 2006 census, its population was 125, in 24 families.

References 

Populated places in Ravansar County